Terrain is the second and final studio album by Australian new wave and pop group Kids in the Kitchen released in August 1987. The album cover shows the band slimmed down to a trio of singer Scott Carne, bassist Craig Harnath and guitarist Claude Carranza. Drummer Bruce Curnow who had departed the band in 1986 and keyboardist Alistair Coia are both featured on the album as co-writers and musicians. The band co-wrote all songs on the album.

Reception
Stuart Coupe from The Canberra Times said the album was "about as scintillating as counting your toes for 40 minutes".

Notes
Following changes in the band's line up, Jason Stonehouse replaced Curnow as drummer and Simon Kershaw replace Coia on keyboards.

Track listing

Charts

References 

1987 albums
Mushroom Records albums
Kids in the Kitchen albums